This is a list of foreign ministers in 1997.

Africa
 Algeria - Ahmed Attaf (1996-1999)
 Angola - Venâncio da Silva Moura (1992-1999)
 Benin - Pierre Osho (1996-1998)
 Botswana - Mompati Merafhe (1994-2008)
 Burkina Faso - Ablassé Ouedraogo (1994-1999)
 Burundi - Luc Rukingama (1996-1998)
 Cameroon -
Ferdinand Oyono (1992-1997)
Augustin Kontchou Kouomegni (1997-2001)
 Cape Verde - Amílcar Spencer Lopes (1996-1998)
 Central African Republic -
Michel Gbezera-Bria (1996-1997)
Jean-Mette Yapende (1997-1999)
 Chad -
Saleh Kebzabo (1996-1997)
Mahamat Saleh Annadif (1997-2003)
 Comoros -
Said Omar Said Ahmed (1996-1997)
Mouhtar Ahmed Charif (1997)
Ibrahim Ali Mzimba (1997-1998)
 Republic of the Congo -
Arsène Tsaty Boungou (1995-1997)
Rodolphe Adada (1997-2007)
 Democratic Republic of the Congo / Zaire -
Gérard Kamanda Wa Kamanda (1996-1997)
Bizima Karaha (1997-1998)
 Côte d'Ivoire - Amara Essy (1990-2000)
 Djibouti - Mohamed Moussa Chehem (1995-1999)
 Egypt - Amr Moussa (1991-2001)
 Equatorial Guinea - Miguel Oyono Ndong Mifumu (1993-1999)
 Eritrea -
Petros Solomon (1994-1997)
Haile Woldetensae (1997-2000)
 Ethiopia - Seyoum Mesfin (1991-2010)
 Gabon - Casimir Oyé-Mba (1994-1999)
 The Gambia -
Baboucarr-Blaise Jagne (1995-1997)
Omar Njie (1997-1998)
 Ghana -
Obed Asamoah (1981-1997)
Kwamena Ahwoi (1997)
Victor Gbeho (1997-2001)
 Guinea - Lamine Camara (1996-1999)
 Guinea-Bissau - Fernando Delfim da Silva (1996-1999)
 Kenya - Kalonzo Musyoka (1993-1998)
 Lesotho - Kelebone Maope (1995-1998)
 Liberia - Monie Captan (1996-2003)
 Libya - Umar Mustafa al-Muntasir (1992-2000)
 Madagascar -
Evariste Marson (1996-1997)
Herizo Razafimahaleo (1997-1998)
 Malawi -
George Ntafu (1996-1997)
Mapopa Chipeta (1997-1999)
 Mali -
Dioncounda Traoré (1994-1997)
Modibo Sidibe (1997-2002)
 Mauritania -
Lemrabott Sidi Mahmoud Ould Cheikh Ahmed (1996-1997)
Ahmed Sidi Ould Khalifa (1997)
Abdallahi Ould Nem (1997)
Sow Abou Demha (1997)
Mohamed El Hacen Ould Lebatt (1997-1998)
 Mauritius -
Paul Bérenger (1995-1997)
Navin Ramgoolam (1997)
Rajkeswur Purryag (1997-2000)
 Morocco - Abdellatif Filali (1985-1999)
 Western Sahara -
Malainine Sadik (1995-1997)
Bachir Mustafa Sayed (1997-1998)
 Mozambique - Leonardo Simão (1994-2005)
 Namibia - Theo-Ben Gurirab (1990-2002)
 Niger -
Ibrahim Hassane Mayaki (1996-1997)
Maman Sambo Sidikou (1997-1999)
 Nigeria - Tom Ikimi (1995-1998)
 Rwanda - Anastase Gasana (1994-1999)
 São Tomé and Príncipe - Homero Jeronimo Salvaterra (1996-1999)
 Senegal - Moustapha Niasse (1993-1998)
 Seychelles -
Danielle de St. Jorre (1989-1997)
France-Albert René (1997)
Jérémie Bonnelame (1997-2005)
 Sierra Leone -
Shirley Gbujama (1996-1997)
Paolo Bangura (1997-1998)
 Somalia - no central government
 Somaliland - Mahmud Salah Nur (1997-2001)
 South Africa - Alfred Baphethuxolo Nzo (1994-1999)
 Sudan - Ali Osman Taha (1995-1998)
 Swaziland - Arthur Khoza (1995-1998)
 Tanzania - Jakaya Kikwete (1995-2006)
 Togo - Koffi Panou (1996-1998)
 Tunisia -
Habib Ben Yahia (1991-1997)
Abderrahim Zouari (1997)
Said Ben Mustapha (1997-1999)
 Uganda - Eriya Kategaya (1996-2001)
 Zambia -
Lawrence Shimba (1996-1997)
Keli Walubita (1997-2002)
 Zimbabwe - Stan Mudenge (1995-2005)

Asia
 Afghanistan -
Mohammad Ghous (1996-1997)
Mullah Abdul Jalil (1997-1998)
 Armenia - Alexander Arzumanyan (1996-1998)
 Azerbaijan - Hasan Hasanov (1993-1998)
 Nagorno-Karabakh -
 Arkadi Ghukasyan (1993-1997)
 Naira Melkumyan (1997-2002)
 Bahrain - Sheikh Muhammad ibn Mubarak ibn Hamad Al Khalifah (1971-2005)
 Bangladesh - Abdus Samad Azad (1996-2001)
 Bhutan - Dawa Tsering (1972-1998)
 Brunei - Pengiran Muda Mohamed Bolkiah (1984–2015)
 Cambodia - Ung Huot (1994-1998)
 China - Qian Qichen (1988-1998)
 Georgia - Irakli Menagarishvili (1995-2003)
 Abkhazia -
 Konstantin Ozgan (1996-1997)
 Sergei Shamba (1997-2004)
 India - I. K. Gujral (1996-1998)
 Indonesia - Ali Alatas (1988-1999)
 Iran -
Ali Akbar Velayati (1981-1997)
Kamal Kharazi (1997-2005)
 Iraq - Muhammad Saeed al-Sahhaf (1992-2001)
 Israel - David Levy (1996-1998)
 Japan -
Yukihiko Ikeda (1996-1997)
Keizō Obuchi (1997-1998)
 Jordan -
Abdul Karim al-Kabariti (1995-1997)
Fayez al-Tarawneh (1997-1998)
 Kazakhstan - Kassym-Jomart Tokayev (1994-1999)
 North Korea - Kim Yong-nam (1983-1998)
 South Korea - Yu Jong-ha (1996-1998)
 Kuwait - Sheikh Sabah Al-Ahmad Al-Jaber Al-Sabah (1978-2003)
 Kyrgyzstan -
Roza Otunbayeva (1994-1997)
Muratbek Imanaliyev (1997-2002)
 Laos - Somsavat Lengsavad (1993-2006)
 Lebanon - Farès Boueiz (1992-1998)
 Malaysia - Abdullah Ahmad Badawi (1991-1999)
 Maldives - Fathulla Jameel (1978-2005)
 Mongolia -
Mendsaikhany Enkhsaikhan (1996-1997)
Shukher Altangerel (1997-1998)
 Myanmar - Ohn Gyaw (1991-1998)
 Nepal -
Prakash Chandra Lohani (1995-1997)
Kamal Thapa (1997-1998)
 Oman - Yusuf bin Alawi bin Abdullah (1982–2020)
 Pakistan -
Sahabzada Yaqub Khan (1996-1997)
Gohar Ayub Khan (1997-1998)
 Philippines - Domingo Siazon, Jr. (1995-2001)
 Qatar - Sheikh Hamad bin Jassim bin Jaber Al Thani (1992-2013)
 Saudi Arabia - Prince Saud bin Faisal bin Abdulaziz Al Saud (1975–2015)
 Singapore - S. Jayakumar (1994-2004)
 Sri Lanka - Lakshman Kadirgamar (1994-2001)
 Syria - Farouk al-Sharaa (1984-2006)
 Taiwan -
John Chiang (1996-1997)
Jason Hu (1997-1999)
 Tajikistan - Talbak Nazarov (1994-2006)
 Thailand -
Prachuab Chaiyasan (1996-1997)
Surin Pitsuwan (1997-2001)
 Turkey -
Tansu Çiller (1996-1997)
İsmail Cem (1997-2002)
 Turkmenistan - Boris Şyhmyradow (1995-2000)
 United Arab Emirates - Rashid Abdullah Al Nuaimi (1980-2006)
 Uzbekistan - Abdulaziz Komilov (1994-2003)
 Vietnam - Nguyễn Mạnh Cầm (1991-2000)
 Yemen - Abd al-Karim al-Iryani (1994-1998)

Australia and Oceania
 Australia - Alexander Downer (1996-2007)
 Fiji -
Filipe Bole (1994-1997)
Berenado Vunibobo (1997-1999)
 Kiribati - Teburoro Tito (1994-2003)
 Marshall Islands - Phillip H. Muller (1994-2000)
 Micronesia -
Asterio R. Takesy (1996-1997)
Epel K. Ilon (1997-2000)
 Nauru -
Rueben Kun (1996-1997)
Kinza Clodumar (1997-1998)
 New Zealand - Don McKinnon (1990-1999)
 Cook Islands - Inatio Akaruru (1989-1999)
 Palau - Sabino Anastacio (1997-2000)
 Papua New Guinea -
Kilroy Genia (1996-1997)
Chris Haiveta (1997)
Roy Yaki (1997-1999)
 Solomon Islands -
David Sitai (1996-1997)
Patterson Oti (1997-2000)
 Tonga - Prince Tupouto'a Tungi (1979-1998)
 Tuvalu - Bikenibeu Paeniu (1996-1999)
 Vanuatu -
Willie Jimmy (1996-1997)
Amos Andeng (1997)
Vital Soksok (1997-1998)
 Western Samoa - Tofilau Eti Alesana (1988-1998)

Europe
 Albania -
Tritan Shehu (1996-1997)
Arjan Starova (1997)
Paskal Milo (1997-2001)
 Andorra -
Manuel Mas Ribó (1994-1997)
Albert Pintat (1997-2001)
 Austria - Wolfgang Schüssel (1995-2000)
 Belarus -
Uladzimir Syanko (1994-1997)
Ivan Antanovich (1997-1998)
 Belgium - Erik Derycke (1995-1999)
 Brussels-Capital Region - Jos Chabert (1989-1999)
 Flanders - Luc Van den Brande (1992-1999)
 Wallonia - William Ancion (1996-1999)
 Bosnia and Herzegovina - Jadranko Prlić (1996-2001)
 Republika Srpska - Aleksa Buha (1992-1998)
 Bulgaria -
Irina Bokova (acting) (1996-1997)
Stoyan Stalev (1997)
Nadezhda Mihailova (1997-2001)
 Croatia - Mate Granić (1993-2000)
 Cyprus -
Alekos Michaelides (1993-1997)
Ioannis Kasoulidis (1997-2003)
 Northern Cyprus - Taner Etkin (1996-1998)
 Czech Republic -
Josef Zieleniec (1992-1997)
Jaroslav Šedivý (1997-1998)
 Denmark - Niels Helveg Petersen (1993-2000)
 Estonia - Toomas Hendrik Ilves (1996-1998)
 Finland - Tarja Halonen (1995-2000)
 France -
Hervé de Charette (1995-1997)
Hubert Védrine (1997-2002)
 Germany - Klaus Kinkel (1992-1998)
 Greece - Theodoros Pangalos (1996-1999)
 Hungary - László Kovács (1994-1998)
 Iceland - Halldór Ásgrímsson (1995-2004)
 Ireland -
Dick Spring (1994-1997)
Ray Burke (1997)
David Andrews (1997-2000)
 Italy - Lamberto Dini (1996-2001)
 Latvia - Valdis Birkavs (1994-1999)
 Liechtenstein - Andrea Willi (1993-2001)
 Lithuania - Algirdas Saudargas (1996-2000)
 Luxembourg - Jacques Poos (1984-1999)
 Macedonia -
Ljubomir Frckovski (1996-1997)
Blagoje Handžiski (1997-1998)
 Malta - George Vella (1996-1998)
 Moldova -
Mihai Popov (1994-1997)
Nicolae Tăbăcaru (1997-2000)
 Netherlands - Hans van Mierlo (1994-1998)
 Norway -
Bjørn Tore Godal (1994-1997)
Knut Vollebæk (1997-2000)
 Poland -
Dariusz Rosati (1995-1997)
Bronisław Geremek (1997-2000)
 Portugal - Jaime Gama (1995-2002)
 Romania -
Adrian Severin (1996-1997)
Andrei Pleşu (1997-1999)
 Russia - Yevgeny Primakov (1996-1998)
 Chechnya -
 Ruslan Chimayev (1996-1997)
 Movladi Udugo (1997-1998)
 San Marino - Gabriele Gatti (1986-2002)
 Slovakia -
Pavol Hamžík (1996-1997)
Zdenka Kramplová (1997-1998)
 Slovenia -
Davorin Kračun (1996-1997)
Zoran Thaler (1997)
Boris Frlec (1997-2000)
 Spain - Abel Matutes (1996-2000)
 Sweden - Lena Hjelm-Wallén (1994-1998)
 Switzerland - Flavio Cotti (1993-1999)
 Ukraine - Hennadiy Udovenko (1994-1998)
 United Kingdom -
Malcolm Rifkind (1995-1997)
Robin Cook (1997-2001)
 Vatican City - Archbishop Jean-Louis Tauran (1990-2003)
 Yugoslavia - Milan Milutinović (1995-1998)
 Montenegro -
 Janko Jeknić (1995-1997)
 Branko Perović (1997-2000)

North America and the Caribbean
 Antigua and Barbuda - Lester Bird (1991-2004)
 The Bahamas - Janet Bostwick (1994-2002)
 Barbados - Billie Miller (1994-2008)
 Belize - Dean Barrow (1993-1998)
 Canada - Lloyd Axworthy (1996-2000)
 Quebec - Sylvain Simard (1996-1998)
 Costa Rica - Fernando Naranjo Villalobos (1994-1998)
 Cuba - Roberto Robaina (1993-1999)
 Dominica - Edison James (1995-1998)
 Dominican Republic - Eduardo Latorre Rodríguez (1996-2000)
 El Salvador - Ramón Ernesto González Giner (1995-1999)
 Grenada -
Keith Mitchell (1995-1997)
Raphael Fletcher (1997-1998)
 Guatemala - Eduardo Stein (1996-2000)
 Haiti - Fritz Longchamp (1995-2001)
 Honduras - Delmer Urbizo Panting (1995-1998)
 Jamaica - Seymour Mullings (1995-2000)
 Mexico - José Ángel Gurría (1994-1998)
 Nicaragua -
Ernesto Leal (1992-1997)
Emilio Álvarez Montalván (1997-1998)
 Panama - Ricardo Alberto Arias (1996-1998)
 Puerto Rico – Norma Burgos (1995–1999)
 Saint Kitts and Nevis - Denzil Douglas (1995-2000)
 Saint Lucia -
Vaughan Lewis (1996-1997)
George Odlum (1997-2001)
 Saint Vincent and the Grenadines - Alpian Allen (1994-1998)
 Trinidad and Tobago - Ralph Maraj (1995-2000)
 United States -
Warren Christopher (1993-1997)
Madeleine Albright (1997-2001)

South America
 Argentina - Guido di Tella (1991-1999)
 Bolivia -
Antonio Araníbar Quiroga (1993-1997)
Javier Murillo de la Rocha (1997-2001)
 Brazil - Luiz Felipe Palmeira Lampreia (1995-2001)
 Chile - José Miguel Insulza (1994-1999)
 Colombia - María Emma Mejía Vélez (1996-1998)
 Ecuador -
Galo Leoro Franco (1994-1997)
José Ayala Lasso (1997-1999)
 Guyana - Clement Rohee (1992-2001)
 Paraguay - Rubén Melgarejo Lanzoni (1996-1998)
 Peru -
Francisco Tudela (1995-1997)
Eduardo Ferrero Costa (1997-1998)
 Suriname -
Faried Pierkhan (1996-1997)
Errol Snijders (1997-2000)
 Uruguay - Álvaro Ramos Trigo (1995-1998)
 Venezuela - Miguel Ángel Burelli Rivas (1994-1999)

Foreign ministers
Foreign ministers
1997